This is a list of railway lines in Great Britain that are currently in operation, split by country and region.

There are a limited number of main inter-regional lines, with all but one entering Greater London. The line from London to the Channel Tunnel is the only line designated 'high speed', although the other main routes also operate limited-stop express services.

The bulk of the secondary network is concentrated in London and the surrounding East and South East regions; an area marketed by National Rail as London and the South East. The majority of these lines are radial to London. There is a further concentration of routes around Birmingham in the West Midlands and in the urbanised part of northern England that stretches from Liverpool in the west, via Greater Manchester to Leeds in the east.

Some areas, such as Wales and Scotland, have relatively sparse railway provision. There are local lines throughout all areas of Great Britain with some services designated as community railways.

England

London

This is a list of routes entirely contained within Greater London.

Inner

Terminus

South East

This is a list of all routes that enter the South East England region.

South West

This is a list of all routes that enter the South West England region.

Inner

Terminus

North West and Central

North West

This is a list of all routes that enter the North West England region.

Central

This is a list of all routes that enter the West Midlands region.

North and East

Anglia

This is a list of all routes that enter the East of England region.

East Midlands

This is a list of all routes that enter the East Midlands region.

Eastern

This is a list of all routes that enter the Yorkshire and the Humber and North East England region.

Scotland

Scotrail Intercity lines
Edinburgh–Dundee line
Glasgow–Edinburgh via Falkirk line
Glasgow–Dundee line
Highland Main Line
Aberdeen–Inverness line

Glasgow commuter lines
Argyle Line
Ayrshire Coast Line
Glasgow–Edinburgh via Carstairs line
Cathcart Circle Lines
Croy Line
Cumbernauld Line
Inverclyde Line
Maryhill Line
Motherwell–Cumbernauld line
North Clyde Line
Paisley Canal line
Shotts Line
Glasgow South Western Line
Whifflet Line

Edinburgh commuter lines
Glasgow–Edinburgh via Carstairs line
Edinburgh–Dunblane line
Fife Circle Line
North Berwick Branch
North Clyde Line
Shotts Line
Borders Railway

Rural lines and Great Scenic Railways
Borders Railway
Far North Line
Kyle of Lochalsh line
West Highland Line
Glasgow South Western Lines

Wales

Main lines
North Wales Coast Line
South Wales Main Line
Shrewsbury–Chester line
Welsh Marches line

Cardiff commuter lines
Butetown branch line
Cardiff City Line
Coryton Line
Ebbw Valley Railway
Gloucester–Newport line
Maesteg Line
Merthyr line
Rhondda line
Rhymney line
Vale of Glamorgan Line

Rural lines
Borderlands line
Cambrian Line
Conwy Valley line
Heart of Wales line
West Wales lines

Lines under construction

References
Note: many maps cited are dead links as of 2016. Current maps are on the National Rail Enquiries - Maps of the UK National Rail Network Web site.

See also
List of closed railway lines in the United Kingdom

 
Railway lines in the United Kingdom